Suzanne Scholte (born 1959, Connecticut) is an American human rights activist and congressional candidate. She is the president of the Defense Forum Foundation. She is also the Vice Co-Chair of the U.S. Committee for Human Rights in North Korea and chairman of Free North Korea Radio. She has received many awards, including the Seoul Peace Prize in 2008 and the Walter Judd Freedom Award in 2010, the Order of Diplomatic Service Merit Sungnye Medal from the Republic of Korea in 2013, the Sanders Peace and Social Justice Award in 2014, and a Volunteer Service (Gold) Award from the President of the United States in 2014. She was made an Honorary Citizen of Seoul in 2008.

Activism
The Seoul Peace Prize award, instituted in 1990 and given biennially, was declared at the Korea Press Center to honor Scholte for the contributions she made to the cause of North Korean peoples' freedom and human rights and the refugees of Western Sahara. She also chairs the U.S.–Western Sahara Association. "I feel ashamed, but also, I feel honored. It is a great honor to receive this great prize even when I just did what I should do," she said. Scholte started her career as the youngest-ever chief-of-staff to a U.S. Member of Congress. Before promoting human rights in North Korea, she had worked for the promotion of human rights in the Soviet Union and Cuba.

In 2011, Scholte, as the president of the Defense Forum Foundation and the North Korea Freedom Coalition, started a project called Operation Rising Eagle to rescue 3 North Koreans stranded in China, mostly orphans who had fled there. The operation proved successful, with the three children given asylum in the United States as refugees in 2012. Scholte has since been lobbying with the U.S. government to expedite the process of providing asylum to North Korean refugees.

As chairman of Free North Korea Radio, Scholte has worked with a team of North Korean defectors led by Kim Seong-min to broadcast outside news and information into North Korea.

As chairman of the North Korea Freedom Coalition, Scholte organizes the annual North Korea Freedom Week to promote the freedom, human rights, and dignity of the North Korean people, which has been held at the end of April every year since 2004. She also organizes the annual Save North Korean Refugees Day, which is a worldwide event held every September 24 to mark the day the People’s Republic of China became a signatory to the Refugee Convention, an agreement it violates by forcefully repatriating North Koreans back to North Korea.

2014 congressional campaign

In 2014, Scholte announced her intention to run for the U.S. House of Representatives in Virginia's 11th congressional district. She won the nomination at a convention on May 11, 2014, and lost against the incumbent Gerry Connolly in the November election.

Personal life
Scholte graduated from the College of William & Mary, Williamsburg, Virginia, and received an Honorary Doctorate in Education from Koshin University, Busan, South Korea. She is married to Chadwick R. Gore and has three sons.

See also

Free North Korea Radio
Human Rights in North Korea
Park Sang-hak

References

External links
 Free North Korea Radio
 Defense Forum Foundation
 Committee for Human Rights in North Korea

1959 births
Living people
Virginia Republicans
College of William & Mary alumni
American human rights activists
Women human rights activists